Naum Ilyich Akhiezer (6 March 1901 – 3 June 1980) was a Soviet and Ukrainian mathematician of Jewish origin, known for his works in approximation theory and the theory of differential and integral operators. He is also known as the author of classical books on various subjects in analysis, and for his work on the history of mathematics. He is the brother of the theoretical physicist Aleksandr Akhiezer.

Biography
Naum Akhiezer was born in Cherykaw (now in Belarus). He studied in the Kiev Institute of Public Education (now Taras Shevchenko National University of Kyiv). In 1928, he defended his PhD thesis "Aerodynamical Investigations" under the supervision of Dmitry Grave. From 1928 to 1933, he worked at the Kyiv University and at the Kiev Aviation Institute.

In 1933, Naum Akhiezer moved to Kharkiv. From 1933 to his death, except for the years of war and evacuation, he was a professor at Kharkov University and at other institutes in Kharkiv. From 1935 to 1940 and from 1947 to 1950 he was director of the Kharkov Institute of Mathematics and Mechanics. For many years he headed the Kharkov Mathematical Society.

Work
Akhiezer obtained important results in approximation theory (in particular, on extremal problems, constructive function theory, and the problem of moments), where he masterly applied the methods of the geometric theory of functions of a complex variable (especially, conformal mappings and the theory of Riemann surfaces) and of functional analysis. He found the fundamental connection between the inverse problem for important classes of differential and finite difference operators of the second order with a finite number of gaps in the spectrum, and the Jacobi inversion problem for Abelian integrals. This connection led to explicit solutions of the inverse problem for the so-called finite-gap operators.

Some publications

Books in analysis

 English translation: 
. English translation: 
. English translation: 
 English translation: 
 English translation: 
 English translation (of the 1st edition): 
 English translation:

History of mathematics
 German translation:

References

External links
 
 History of Approximation Theory (HAT) page
 Author profile in the database zbMATH

1901 births
1980 deaths
20th-century Belarusian mathematicians
People from Cherykaw
People from Cherikovsky Uyezd
Taras Shevchenko National University of Kyiv alumni
Recipients of the Order of the Red Banner of Labour
Belarusian Jews
Soviet mathematicians
Jewish scientists
Functional analysts
Operator theorists
Approximation theorists
Mathematical analysts
Ukrainian Jews